Dr. Diabolical's Cliffhanger is a steel roller coaster at Six Flags Fiesta Texas in San Antonio, Texas. Located in the Crackaxle Canyon section, it was designed as a dive coaster model and was manufactured by Bolliger & Mabillard. It opened on July 30, 2022, replacing the Sundance Theatre. At a maximum vertical angle of 95°, the roller coaster is the world's steepest dive coaster.

History
On June 12, 2021, Six Flags Fiesta Texas held the American Coaster Enthusiasts "Roller Coaster Rodeo." At the event, the park started teasing their new attraction. Additionally, the park also confirmed the removal of the Sundance Theatre for the upcoming attraction on June 14, 2021. The Sundance Theatre was an original theatre venue that opened with the park in 1992. 

On July 28, 2021, Six Flags Fiesta Texas announced Dr. Diabolical's Cliffhanger for the 30th anniversary of the park in 2022. In November 2021, the first concrete footers were poured. On February 5, 2022, the ride's lift hill was officially topped off. Soft opening for the roller coaster began on July 29, 2022 for season pass holders and the news media. The roller coaster officially opened to the public on July 30, 2022 with a grand opening ceremony.

Ride experience
The roller coaster features the steepest dive coaster drop at a 95-degree (a beyond vertical drop), as well as a second , near-vertical drop.

Theme
As guests enter the queue line for the roller coaster, they will find themselves immersed in the story of Dr. Diabolical and her evil quest to create menacing creatures to frighten the world. To bring her creations to life, she has constructed a machine to capture the essence of human adrenaline and fear.

References

External links
Official website

Six Flags Fiesta Texas
Roller coasters in Texas
Roller coasters operated by Six Flags